"Royal Command" is an episode of the British comedy television series The Goodies.

This episode is also known as "Royal Command Performance".

Written by The Goodies, with songs and music by Bill Oddie.

Plot
The Goodies are in charge of the Royal Command Performance, and the Royal family arrives for the occasion. Tim has not realising that the Royal family always went to sleep during the performances, Bill and Graeme are horrified to find them asleep and prods them awake. The result of actually seeing the performances makes them demand another show. Tim comments: "I'd be happy to be an OBE — best of all, an Earl and an OBE." Graeme, looking at Tim, comments: "You'd be an earlobe!"

The second show is presented to the crowned heads of the world. The acts, which include Rolf Harris and Brotherhood of Man, prove so unpopular that the Royals take control of the entertainment industry, introducing new series such as "Ponyrama with Dobbin Day"; as it turns cruel and violent, it turns the royalists into a pack of wild animals lasting out for blood, which shocks Tim in to shame.

When the Royal family are later injured from "Horse Riding on Ice" and bandaged in hospital, The Goodies take their place so that the Royal Family will not be missed by the public. A remount of the Coronation is announced as a tourist grab, which the real Queen accepts, due to having missed it the first time. The Goodies move into Buckingham Palace, with Tim pretending to be the Queen, Bill pretending to be Prince Charles, Graeme pretending to be Princess Anne, and a store mannequin is brought in to be the Duke of Edinburgh — and they make an appearance on the balcony where they wave to cheering onlookers. The Royal family, who are watching everything on television from their hospital beds, are pleased with what is happening, until they realise The Goodies intend to re-enact the Coronation, in Westminster Abbey, with the genuine Archbishop of Canterbury, so that Tim will be crowned as the Queen and the Goodies will be the new "Royal Family".

The Queen, Duke, Prince Charles and Princess Anne, leave their hospital beds to defend their rights as the Royal family and to get rid of the imposters — and a rush for the Coronation Crown ensues. Eventually, The Goodies are the new rulers, while the former Royals get their own comedy series on BBC 2

Cultural references
 Royal Variety Performance
 The British Royal Family

DVD and VHS releases

This episode has been released on DVD.

References

 "The Complete Goodies" — Robert Ross, B T Batsford, London, 2000
 "The Goodies Rule OK" — Robert Ross, Carlton Books Ltd, Sydney, 2006
 "From Fringe to Flying Circus — 'Celebrating a Unique Generation of Comedy 1960-1980'" — Roger Wilmut, Eyre Methuen Ltd, 1980
 "The Goodies Episode Summaries" — Brett Allender
 "The Goodies — Fact File" — Matthew K. Sharp

External links

The Goodies (series 7) episodes
1977 British television episodes